Oshakan is a village in the Ashtarak Municipality of the Aragatsotn Province of Armenia located 8 kilometers southwest from Ashtarak. It is well known to historians and pilgrims of the Armenian Apostolic Church as the site of the grave of Mesrop Mashtots, the inventor of the Armenian alphabet.

History
During the Arsacid Dynasty of the Kingdom of Armenia, it served as the main town of Ayrarat province and the capital of its Aragatsotn canton from which the Amatuni noble family ruled.  However, Oshakan is best known for the Saint Mesrop Mashtots Church which is the burial place of Saint Mesrop Mashtots, the creator of the Armenian alphabet. The church houses his grave and was rebuilt by Catholicos George IV in 1875. Wall paintings on the interior were done in 1960 by the artist H. Minasian. Saint Mesrop Cathedral is the seat of the Aragatsotn Diocese of the Armenian Apostolic Church.

Just to the south of the town is the Didikond Hill, where excavations have uncovered a fort and five palaces built around the 7th to 5th centuries BC.

To the north of town located in the Mankanots Valley is Saint Sion Church dating from the 7th century AD. It is believed to mark the grave of Byzantine Emperor Mauricius or his mother, as one historian claims he came from Oshakan. Adjacent to the church is a pillar on a plinth dated to the 6th or 7th century.

West of Oshakan is a bridge dated to 1706 that crosses over the Kasagh River. 

On a hilltop overlooking the town there is a Tukh Manuk Shrine with a large khachkar monument adjacent that sits within a large cemetery. The portion of the cemetery higher upon the hill is the older section while the lower portion contains a recent cemetery. There are Iron Age tomb fields around the area. Higher upon the same hill may be seen the shrine of Saint Grigor. Nearby are also the shrines of S. Sargis, S. Tadevos the Apostle, and a rock-cut Astvatsatsin. 

The village of Oshakan is mentioned in a 13th-century inscription on the southern wall of the Katoghike Church of the Astvatsnkal Monastery built between the 5th and 13th centuries. It reads, 

Oshakan is known to have had a brief visit during October 1734 by Abraham Kretatsi during the time while he was serving the Catholicos Abraham II.  He wrote a short passage speaking of his previous days stay at Mughni to visit the Monastery of Surb Gevorg, "In the morning, after services, we went down to Oshakan."

Sister cities
  Alfortville, France

Gallery

See also 
Aragatsotn Province

References
 
 World Gazetteer: Armenia – World-Gazetteer.com
 Report of the results of the 2001 Armenian Census
 Oshakan

Bibliography 
 
 
Kiesling, Rediscovering Armenia, pp. 14, available online at the US embassy to Armenia's website

External links 
Places of interest in the village Oshakan

Populated places in Aragatsotn Province
Yazidi populated places in Armenia